Avon-la-Pèze is a commune in the Aube department in the Grand Est region of north-central France.

The inhabitants of the commune are known as Avonnais or Avonnaises.

Geography
Avon-la-Pèze is located some 30 km north-west of Troyes and 17 km south by south-west of Romilly-sur-Seine. Access to the commune is by road D440 from Rigny-la-Nonneuse in the north which passes through the centre of the commune and the village before continuing south to Marcilly-le-Hayer. The D23 comes from Avant-les-Marcilly in the north-west passing west through the commune and the village and continuing to Saint-Lupien in the south-east. The D16 branches off the D23 east of the village and goes north-east to Marigny-le-Châtel. There is the hamlet of La Pezé to the north of the village. There is a large forest to the west of the village (the Bois de la Garenne) and the rest of the commune is farmland.

Neighbouring communes and villages

Administration

List of Successive Mayors

Demography
In 2017 the commune had 193 inhabitants.

Sites and Monuments
The Parish Church once belonged to the Abbey of Pothières in Côte-d'Or. Rebuilt in the 16th century, altered and distorted in the 18th century, it came under Saint-Pierre-ès-Liens. It contains a large number of items that are registered as historical objects:

A Statue: Saint Pierre (17th century)
A Statuette: Angel (17th century)
A Statue: Virgin and child (16th century)
A Group sculpture: Virgin of Pity (16th century)
A Statue: Saint Fiacre (17th century)
A Statue: Saint Éloi (16th century)
A Statue: Saint Catherine (16th century)
A Retable on the main Altar (1544)
A Chalice (19th century)
A Paten (1819-1838)
A Chalice (1819-1838)
A Baptismal font (14th century)
A Chandelier (19th century)
A Cabinet for Archives (17th century)
A Processional Staff: Saint Nicolas (17th century)
A Processional Staff: Saint Pierre (17th century)
A Statue: Christ on the Cross (16th century)
A Statue: Saint Marguerite (16th century)

See also
Communes of the Aube department

References

External links
Avon-la-Pèze on the old IGN website 
Avon-la-Pèze on Géoportail, National Geographic Institute (IGN) website 
Avon laPeze on the 1750 Cassini Map

Communes of Aube